Dimas Filgueiras Filho (born 13 May 1944) is a Brazilian former footballer.

References

1944 births
Living people
Association football defenders
Brazilian footballers
Botafogo de Futebol e Regatas players
Footballers at the 1964 Summer Olympics
Olympic footballers of Brazil